This is a list of Sphenisciformes species by global population. While numbers are estimates, they have been made by the experts in their fields.

Sphenisciformes (from the Latin for "wedge-shaped") is the taxonomic order to which the penguins belong. BirdLife International has assessed 18 species. 16 (89% of total species) have had their population estimated: those missing are the king and little penguins, both of which have been assessed as being of least concern.

A variety of methods are used for counting penguins, and April 2012 saw their first census from space, when imagery from Ikonos, QuickBird-2, and WorldView-2 satellites were used to count Antarctican emperors. This is a similar technique to that used by the UNHCR to count humans in Somalia. Most maritime surveys use strip transect and distance sampling to measure density; this is then extrapolated over the animal's range. The Galapagos has been counted annually since 1961 by the Galápagos National Park Service. By land and sea, they carry out a full census in ten areas and partial census in four. The 2012 observation of 721 birds showed that levels have remained the same over recent years, and the current full estimate need not be changed. For more information on how these estimates were ascertained, see Wikipedia's articles on population biology and population ecology.

Species that can no longer be included in a list of this nature include the Waitaha penguin, the last of which is believed to have perished between 1300 and 1500 AD (soon after the Polynesian arrival to New Zealand), and the Chatham penguin, which is only known through subfossils but may have been kept in captivity sometime between 1867 and 1872. Adélies and emperors nest on Antarctica and feed on broken pack ice; global warming's effect on the latter may affect their numbers, and the chinstraps and gentoo, which both feed in open waters, have been making inroads into the Adélie and emperors' formerly ice-packed range. The gentoo have thus seen 7500% population growth since 1974, and the chinstraps 2700%.

Species by global population

See also

Lists of birds by population
Lists of organisms by population

References

Birds
Sphenisciformes